Hempin' Aint Easy is the third solo studio album by American rapper B-Legit. It was released on July 25, 2000 via Koch Records. Production was handled by Studio Ton, Keith Clizark, Meech Wells, Clint "Payback" Sands, Sam Bostic, Ant Banks, Big Time Swisher Productions, Bosko, Daz Dillinger, Sin and Tone Capone. It features guest appearances from E-40, Archie Lee, Big Remy, D-Shot, Harm, Kurupt, Levitti, Lil' Keke, Little Bruce, Mac Shawn, Mack 10, Mr. Clean, Otis & Shug, Richie Rich, Ronnie Spencer, Shortyega, Snoop Dogg and The Mossie.

The album peaked at No. 64 on the Billboard 200, No. 13 on the Top R&B/Hip-Hop Albums and No. 21 on the Independent Albums in the United States.

Track listing

Sample credits
Track 4 contains elements from "Humpin'" written by Charlie Wilson, Lonnie Simmons, Ronnie Wilson and Rudy Taylor and performed by The Gap Band
Track 7 contains elements from "Shine Your Light" written by Glenn Grainger
Track 18 contains replayed elements from "Don't Look Any Further" written by Franne Golde, Dennis Lambert and Duane Hitchings

Charts

References

External links

1999 albums
B-Legit albums
E1 Music albums
MNRK Music Group albums
Albums produced by Bosko
Sick Wid It Records albums
Albums produced by Ant Banks
Albums produced by Studio Ton
Albums produced by Daz Dillinger